Walker Township is the name of some places in the U.S. state of Pennsylvania:

Walker Township, Centre County, Pennsylvania
Walker Township, Huntingdon County, Pennsylvania
Walker Township, Juniata County, Pennsylvania
Walker Township, Schuylkill County, Pennsylvania

Pennsylvania township disambiguation pages